Erica Oomen is a Dutch female track cyclist who lived in Schijndel. She was selected, together with Sandra de Neef, to represent the Netherlands in the sprint event at the 1981 UCI Track Cycling World Championships.

Personal
In the mid-1980s she moved to Helmond.

References

External links
 profile at cyclingdatabase.com

Dutch female cyclists
Dutch cyclists at the UCI Track Cycling World Championships
People from Schijndel
Cyclists from North Brabant
Living people
Year of birth missing (living people)